The Departmental Council of Morbihan is the deliberative assembly of the French department of Morbihan. It consists of 42 members (departmental councillors) elected from 21 cantons and its headquarters are in Vannes, capital of the department. The departmental councilors are elected for a 6-years term.

The president of the departmental council is David Lappartient.

Vice-Presidents 
The president of the departmental council is assisted by 12 vice-presidents chosen from among the departmental advisers. Each of them has a delegation of authority.

References

See also  
 Morbihan 
 Departmental council (France)

External links  
 

Morbihan
Departmental councils (France)